Vali Kandi may refer to:
 Vali Kandi, East Azerbaijan
 Vali Kandi, West Azerbaijan